John Hilworth (born May 23, 1957) is a Canadian former professional ice hockey player who played 57 games in the National Hockey League for the Detroit Red Wings. Hilworth was born in Jasper, Alberta, Canada.

Career statistics

Regular season and playoffs

External links
 

1957 births
Adirondack Red Wings players
Canadian ice hockey defencemen
Detroit Red Wings draft picks
Detroit Red Wings players
Fort Wayne Komets players
Houston Apollos players
Ice hockey people from Alberta
Johnstown Red Wings players
Kalamazoo Wings (1974–2000) players
Kansas City Red Wings players
Living people
Medicine Hat Tigers players
People from Jasper, Alberta
Toledo Goaldiggers players
Wichita Wind players